The Capitol Hill Block Party is an annual three-day music festival and block party held each July in the Capitol Hill neighborhood of Seattle, Washington, United States. Performance genres include pop, R&B, indie rock, punk, EDM, and many more. The festival has featured numerous famous acts over the years including Macklemore, Mudhoney, The Presidents of the United States of America, Jack White, Sonic Youth, Lizzo, RL Grime, and Amine. The festival has attracted several major brand sponsorships and even created a donation program for several non-profit organizations. The main events of the festival are located on Pike Street and Pine Street, however, the crowds and foot traffic branch out into more of the neighboring streets, causing nearby businesses to be irritated. Although the festival is largely known for its musical performances, the block party also includes free events, such as yoga and a skate competition, located at the Cal Anderson Park.

Capitol Hill Block Party was canceled in 2020 and 2021 to comply with social distancing mandates imposed during the COVID-19 pandemic.

History 
Founded in 1997 by Jen Gapay, the festival was originally a one-day event with just one stage, five bands, and a couple of DJs. Gapay continued to produce the party until 2000, when David Meinert and Marcus Charles took over, adding a second stage and then a second day in 2001. Beginning to market the festival as an "event", the new owners earned a sponsorship from The Stranger and began to charge $8 per ticket for admission. The event presented over 20 bands and had roughly 3,000 people present at the two day festival. Initially as an extension on a trial basis by the Seattle special events office, the festival became a three-day event from 2010; overall attendance that year was estimated at 30,000 people.

The festival's programmer and talent buyer Jason Lajeunesse became the owner in 2011 and continues to run it to this day. In 2012, notable efforts were made by the new owner to rework the event to have less of a negative impact on local businesses revenue through marketing at the festival. Under Lajeunesse's ownership, he strives to use this event as an opportunity for small, local bands to gain exposure in front of large audiences. Through the most recent event in 2019, the festival has managed to book large notable artists, but continues to make an effort to dedicate 65-70% of the lineup to local artists. The event has expanded to showcase over 120 acts over the span of seven stages.

Tickets and pricing 
In the initial years of the block party, admission to the gathering was free. Starting in 2001, tickets cost $8 to attend the event. As the party expanded to a three-day event in 2010, tickets were priced at $23 for a single day pass or $60 for admission to all three days, sold on The Stranger's website. In 2015, ticket prices for the three-day pass increased depending on date of purchase, beginning with a cost of $99 through April 2 for those interested in purchasing tickets early prior to the release of the full lineup, rising to $125 per pass purchased before July 4, and tickets purchased between July 5 and the beginning of the festival cost $150. VIP passes, including free gifts and access to the VIP beer garden, cost $250 for the three-day pass. In 2019, tickets to the event cost $70 for a one-day pass and starting prices for three-day passes cost $160. Options for VIP passes and two-day passes were also available for purchase through the event's website, where all official ticket sales are held.

Sponsors and donations 
Major sponsors of the block party include AT&T (via their Capitol Hill-based store The Lounge by AT&T), Jones Soda, the ACLU, and The Stranger. In 2013, the festival offered an option to donate to the local non-profit, 12th Avenue Arts project, when purchasing a ticket to the event. Capitol Hill Block Party matched donations up to a total of $5000, and in 2019, the producers reopened the same matching donations program for non-profits Jubilee Women’s Center, The Vera Project, Artists for Progress, and Lifelong.

Controversy 
The three day event has received criticism and protestations due to its effects on local businesses that are located on the streets that the event takes place on. Complaints regarding the event begin to circulate around the significant decrease in sales that many businesses experience throughout the days of the festival. In 2019, although increased visitation to the area, 39% businesses surveyed for the Capitol Hill Special Events assessment claimed that business decreased as a result of the event. The quality of interaction with businesses in this area, including vandalism and littering, are further areas of complaints; there have been instances of trespassers attempting to use the property of nearby shops to illegally enter the festival. Parking and traffic contribute to the concerns of the businesses that were surveyed. Likewise, residents within and near the party grounds complain of loud noise preventing them from being able to sleep through the late hours of the event.

Many concerns and controversy regarding the event are about accessibility and physical safety. The increase of tickets to attend the event have become a common complaint about the accessibility to the block party. Moreover, the size of the audience at the various stages is of concern, with individuals describing difficulty with mobility while in the crowds in the fenced areas. The fences pose a safety issue and block visibility to local businesses. In 2019, changes were required to be made to certain aspects of the physical layout of the outside area of the event to adapt to the needs of the surrounding stores and restaurants.

References

External links 

 Official website

Festivals in Seattle